Thomas Larsen (born 1 June 1980) is a Danish rower. He competed in the men's coxless pair event at the 2008 Summer Olympics.

References

1980 births
Living people
Danish male rowers
Olympic rowers of Denmark
Rowers at the 2008 Summer Olympics
Rowers from Copenhagen